Crawford Murray MacLehose, Baron MacLehose of Beoch,  (16 October 1917 – 27 May 2000), was a British politician, diplomat and the 25th Governor of Hong Kong, from 1971 to 1982. He was the longest-serving governor of the colony, with four successive terms in office.

Early life and career 
Murray MacLehose was born in Glasgow, Scotland, in October 1917 as the second child of Hamish Alexander MacLehose and Margaret Bruce Black. He attended Rugby School in 1931 and Balliol College, Oxford.

During World War II, while under the cover of being the British vice-consul, MacLehose trained Chinese guerrillas to operate behind Japanese lines to carry out sabotage.

MacLehose was principal private secretary to Foreign Secretary George Brown in the late 1960s.

His career almost stalled when he left a copy of a confidential telegram in a bank in 1967. The document contained correspondence between then British Prime Minister Harold Wilson and US President Lyndon Johnson concerning the Vietnam War. Another British diplomat was able to recover the telegram before its contents could be leaked. Upon being informed of the potential security breach, Wilson and Brown decided against allowing an investigation into MacLehose error out of appreciation of his abilities and record. This decision likely saved his career, and allowed MacLehose to proceed to his next post as British Ambassador to the Republic of Vietnam in 1967.

Between this time and 1971, MacLehose served in the British Embassy in Beijing and as Ambassador to Denmark.

Governor of Hong Kong 
MacLehose became Governor of Hong Kong in November 1971. He held the position until May 1982, making him Hong Kong's longest-serving governor: his 10 years and 6 months in office exceeded Sir Alexander Grantham's record by one month. He was widely and affectionately known as "Jock the Sock", in reference both to his Scottish heritage and to his name, 'hose' being a word meaning sock or stocking.

MacLehose stood well over six feet tall. He avoided wearing his gubernatorial uniform, as he felt very ill at ease in it.

A diplomat with a British Labour Party background, MacLehose introduced a wide range of reforms during his time in office that laid the foundation of modern Hong Kong as a cohesive, self-aware society.  He had Chinese recognised as an official language for communication, alongside English.  He greatly expanded welfare and set up a massive public housing programme. Under massive public pressure, he created the ICAC to root out corruption. By establishing the District Boards, he greatly improved government accountability. He oversaw the construction of the Mass Transit Railway, Hong Kong's transportation backbone, and other major infrastructure projects.  On his watch, community and arts facilities were expanded, and public campaigns, such as against litter and violent crime, were introduced.

These changes required approval from the UK Government Treasury for increased expenditure, and it was against some opposition that, in his first two years in office, Hong Kong government expenditure grew by over 50%.

MacLehose was convinced that China would eventually reclaim Hong Kong and opposed any significant move towards constitutional democracy in Hong Kong.

Other notable policies 
Other major policies introduced during the MacLehose era included:

 The introduction of nine years of compulsory education.
 The introduction of the Ten-year Housing Programme in 1972 to alleviate housing problems.
 The establishment of satellite 'new towns', such as Sha Tin and Tuen Mun.
 The establishment of the Country Parks.
 The introduction and approval of a Labour Ordinance.
 The establishment of the social assistance scheme.
 The construction of the Mass Transit Railway.
 An expansion of community facilities.
 The adoption of Chinese as an official language.
 The introduction of paid holidays.
 An increase in social service provision for the elderly.
 The introduction of infirmity and disability allowances.
 The introduction of redundancy payments for workers.
 The introduction of the Home Ownership Scheme to encourage owner-occupation.
 The introduction of a major rehabilitation programme for the disabled and disadvantaged.
 An increase in the number of schools and hospitals.
 The introduction of Criminal and Law Enforcement Injuries Compensation.
 The introduction of Traffic Accident Victims Assistance.
 The introduction of special needs allowances for the elderly.
 The introduction of sickness allowances for eligible manual and lower-paid non-manual workers.
 The introduction of weekly rest days.
 The introduction of Labour Tribunals.
 The establishment of the Junior Secondary Education Assessment (JSEA) system to increase the number of subsidised places in senior secondary education.
 The establishment of Geotechnical Engineering Office (part of Civil Engineering and Development Department) to ensure safeties of slopes and hillside to avoid further loss of lives due to landslides and slips of Sau Mau Ping in 1972 and 1976.
 The establishment of the Jubilee Sports Centre
 The establishment of the Hong Kong Academy for Performing Arts

Hong Kong sovereignty negotiations 

In 1979, MacLehose raised the question of Britain's 99-year lease of the New Territories (an area that encompasses all territories north of Boundary Street on the Kowloon Peninsula), with Deng Xiaoping. The talks, although inconclusive at the time, eventually involved top British Government officials and paved the way for the handover of Hong Kong in its entirety, including those parts ceded to the UK in perpetuity, to the People's Republic of China on 1 July 1997.

Post-governorship and later life 
After his governorship ended in 1982, MacLehose was made a life peer as Baron MacLehose of Beoch, of Maybole in the District of Kyle and Carrick and of Victoria in Hong Kong, later that year. In 1983, MacLehose was made a Knight of the Thistle. In 1992 he was awarded an honorary doctorate (LLD) by the University of Hong Kong. When he was 80 years old, he,  Sir Edward Heath and Lord Howe, attended the official swearing-in ceremony of the Hong Kong Special Administrative Region's Chief Executive on 1 July 1997, which was boycotted by the British Government.

MacLehose died in Ayrshire, Scotland, in May 2000.

Honours and recognition 
 Member of the Most Excellent Order of the British Empire (MBE) (1946)
 Companion of the Most Distinguished Order of Saint Michael and Saint George (CMG) (1964)
 Knight Commander of the Most Distinguished Order of Saint Michael and Saint George (KCMG) (1971)
 HKnight of the Most Venerable Order of the Hospital of St. John of Jerusalem (KStJ) (1972)
 Knight Commander of the Royal Victorian Order (KCVO) (1975)
 Knight Grand Cross of the Most Excellent Order of the British Empire (GBE) (1976)
 Life Peerage (1982) (Barony of MacLehose of Beoch, of Maybole in the District of Kyle and Carrick and of Victoria in Hong Kong)
 Knight of the Thistle (KT) (1983)
 Honorary Doctor of Laws, University of Hong Kong
The 100-kilometre MacLehose Trail, stretching from Sai Kung Peninsula to Tuen Mun in the New Territories, was named after him (Maclehose was an enthusiastic hiker)
The MacLehose Medical Rehabilitation Centre, the MacLehose Dental Centre, the Lady MacLehose Holiday Village, and the Sir Murray MacLehose Trust Fund was also named to commemorate him or his wife

References

External links
 BBC News: Former Hong Kong Governor dies

1917 births
2000 deaths
Alumni of Balliol College, Oxford
People educated at Rugby School
Governors of Hong Kong
Knights Commander of the Order of St Michael and St George
Knights Commander of the Royal Victorian Order
Knights Grand Cross of the Order of the British Empire
Knights of the Thistle
Crossbench life peers
Diplomatic peers
Deputy Lieutenants of Ayrshire and Arran
Ambassadors of the United Kingdom to Vietnam
Ambassadors of the United Kingdom to China
Ambassadors of the United Kingdom to Denmark
Principal Private Secretaries to the Secretary of State for Foreign and Commonwealth Affairs
Politicians from Glasgow
Members of HM Diplomatic Service
20th-century Hong Kong people
20th-century British politicians
20th-century British diplomats
Life peers created by Elizabeth II